Selection Best is the third greatest hits album by Japanese J-pop band Day After Tomorrow.

Track listing

2006 greatest hits albums
Day After Tomorrow (band) compilation albums
Avex Group compilation albums